Calamotropodes is a monotypic snout moth genus described by Anthonie Johannes Theodorus Janse in 1922. Its only species, Calamotropodes grisella, described in the same publication, is found in Zimbabwe.

References

Endemic fauna of Zimbabwe
Phycitinae
Monotypic moth genera
Lepidoptera of Zimbabwe
Moths of Sub-Saharan Africa